Myddle—also formerly known as Mydle, Middle, M'dle, Meadley and Medle—is a small village in Shropshire, England, about 10 miles north of Shrewsbury, the county town of Shropshire. Myddle lies in the parish of Myddle, Broughton and Harmer Hill. The 2001 census recorded a population of 1,142 in the village, rising to 1,333 at the 2011 census.

In a book written about Myddle in 1700, the author, Richard Gough, describes the parish community and its doings, and his work has been used as a study of human relations. The book has been called "the greatest insight" into the "middle sort" of people in Early Modern England.

History
The village of Myddle was occupied by 1066, with a manor house for Siward, Earl of Northumbria completed in the 1050s.

By 1086, the year of the Domesday Book under William the Conqueror, the manor house was occupied by Rainald the Sheriff. During the 12th century, the Fitz Alan family of Clun occupied the manor house, with John Le Strange acquiring it around 1165.

In 1234, Myddle was the location of the signing of a treaty between King Henry III and Welsh Prince Llewellyn.

In September 2005 and September 2007 a detectorist uncovered a small number of hammered gold coins dating back to the 14th century.

The Le Strange's dynasty ended in 1580 due to the lack of male heirs to the estate, and Myddle passed to the Thomas Stanley, 1st Earl of Derby after he married Joan Le Strange. Their son, Thomas, became the second Earl of Derby.

Elizabeth I granted Thomas Barnston a licence to sell land in Myddle in 1596, and in 1600 Sir Thomas Egerton purchased the village. Egerton's son was created by James I the first Earl of Bridgewater in 1617.

During the English Civil War in 1642, Charles I recruited 20 men from Myddle, with 13 killed.

Myddle suffered an earthquake in 1688, but continued to expand throughout the coming centuries, with butchers' shops, taverns, fishmongers and masons inhabiting the village by about 1850.

In 1901 the village was graced by a visit of The All American Trumpeters who put on a free show to raise funds for a memorial to Queen Victoria.

The manor house was destroyed and sold to pay the death duties of the third Earl Brownlow in 1924.

In 1942, during the Second World War, an RAF Whitley bomber crashed in Myddle after taking off from nearby Sleap Airfield.

Myddle Castle

A castle was constructed in Myddle between 1308 and 1310 by Lord John Le Strange as a stronghold against the Welsh after the family obtained a licence to convert the manor house into a castle.

Sometime around 1449, Elizabeth Cobham received the castle as part of her dowery from Richard, 7th Lord Strange.  After Lord Strange died, Cobham married Sir Roger Kynaston in 1450.  Elizabeth died in 1453, and left the castle to Kynaston.  Upon Roger's death in 1495, his son Humphrey Kynaston inherited the castle, but allowed it to fall into disrepair, and abandoned it some time later.

The castle has stood empty since the 16th century, with one visitor to the village, John Leland, describing the castle as  around 1540. The castle collapsed during the 1688 earthquake.

The castle was repaired by John Hume Egerton in 1849, who inscribed his name into a block in the castle's wall.

The castle is now a Grade II Listed Building and, since a portion collapsed in 1976, has been scheduled for repair.

Notable residents
Humphrey Kynaston, highwayman
Richard Gough, author of Antiquities and Memoirs of the Parish of Myddle, was born in 1635 and died in 1723.  He was educated in Myddle and Broughton and lived at Newton on the Hill. To celebrate the 300th anniversary of Gough's account of village life, a group of 18 local people created an illustrated pack of six walks around Myddle which have become known as the "Gough Walks".
William Gosling, footballer who played in gold medal-winning England team in 1900 Summer Olympics, owned and lived at Marton Hall near the village.
Jas Mann, lead singer of Babylon Zoo
Edward Stollins, co-founder of Our Price (chain of record shops, no longer in business)

See also
Listed buildings in Myddle and Broughton

References

Sources 
 G. Grazebrook and J.P. Rylands, The Visitation of Shropshire taken in the year 1623 (Harleian Visitations) Part 1 (London 1889). (Myddle family pedigrees)
 R. Gough, The History of Myddle (Ed. with Introduction and Notes by David Hey). (Penguin, Harmondsworth 1981).
 D. Hey, An English Rural Community: Myddle under the Tudors and Stuarts (Leicester University Press 1974).

External links
 http://www.myddle.net/
 Village information
 Gough, Richard, Antiquities & Memoirs of the Parish of Myddle, County of Salop, A.D. 1700 Published 1875.

Villages in Shropshire